The 2008 Pioneer Las Vegas Bowl was an NCAA-sanctioned Division I FBS post-season college football bowl game between the BYU Cougars (third place overall in the Mountain West Conference) and the Arizona Wildcats (fifth pick from the Pacific-10 Conference).  The game was played on December 20, 2008, starting at 5 p.m. PST at 40,000-seat off campus Sam Boyd Stadium of the University of Nevada, Las Vegas.

The Wildcats stunned the 16th ranked Cougars in the coldest Las Vegas Bowl in history, 31–21. It was televised on ESPN. The announcers were Mike Patrick and Todd Blackledge with the sideline reporting by Holly Rowe. Starting in 2001, the Las Vegas Bowl featured a matchup of teams from Mountain West and the Pac-10.

Scoring summary

References

Las Vegas Bowl
Las Vegas Bowl
BYU Cougars football bowl games
Arizona Wildcats football bowl games
Las Vegas Bowl
December 2008 sports events in the United States